Maitlan Joy Brown (born 5 June 1997) is an Australian cricketer. She plays as a right-arm fast bowler and right-handed batter for the New South Wales Breakers in the Women's National Cricket League (WNCL), and for the Sydney Sixers in the Women's Big Bash League (WBBL).

Early and personal life
Brown was born on 5 June 1997 in Taree, New South Wales, and grew up in nearby Wingham. She has generated some attention for a skill that has been described as "bizarre", namely her ability to speak and sing with her mouth shut. She has said that she taught herself the skill as a child, while sitting in the car on long road trips with her family. She can also juggle.

In addition to pursuing success on the cricket field, Brown is keen on designing. She is studying industrial design at the University of Canberra, and runs her own business, called Six Stitch Design.

Domestic career
As a youngster, Brown was part of the New South Wales academy and played for various youth teams before being released in 2016. She was then signed by the ACT Meteors on a rookie contract and ended up playing all six matches for the team in the 2016–17 WNCL season. She also joined the Melbourne Renegades for WBBL02, and produced "several exciting cameos" including 30 off 15 balls against the Sydney Sixers.

In WBBL03, Brown was the Renegades' second-highest wicket-taker with 15 scalps. She was included in the 2018 Women's National Performance Squad.

She finished as the Renegades' second-highest wicket-taker in WBBL05 with 16 wickets but was unable to prevent the team losing to the Brisbane Heat in the semi-final.

On 6 November 2020, Brown was ruled out of the remainder of the WBBL06 season with a hamstring problem which also kept her out of the 2020–21 WNCL season.

On 12 May 2021, it was announced that Brown had moved from the Meteors to the New South Wales Breakers, the state side for which she had played at academy level.

International career
In April 2017, she toured Sri Lanka with the Australia A squad, and in August 2017 she was one of eight players named in Cricket Australia's inaugural Women's National Performance Squad. In April 2019, Cricket Australia awarded her with a contract with the National Performance Squad ahead of the 2019–20 season.

In August 2020, Brown was named in Australia's limited-overs squads for their home series against New Zealand.

In August 2021, Brown was named in Australia's squad for their series against India, which included a one-off day/night Test match as part of the tour. In January 2022, Brown was named in Australia's A squad for their series against England A, with the matches being played alongside the Women's Ashes.

References

External links

Maitlan Brown at cricket.com.au

1997 births
Living people
Sportswomen from New South Wales
Cricketers from New South Wales
Australian women cricketers
ACT Meteors cricketers
Melbourne Renegades (WBBL) cricketers